Azurina hirundo, the swallow damsel is a species of ray-finned fish from the damselfish family Pomacentridae. It occurs on reefs in the eastern Pacific Ocean around Baja California, the Guadalupe Island and the Revillagigedo Islands.

References 

hirundo
Fish described in 1898